Van Wies Point is a cape on the Hudson River in Albany County, New York.

Van Wies Point was named after Jan Van Wie.

References

Headlands of the United States
Landforms of Albany County, New York